Athletics is, along with Football, the sport that has always been practiced at Sporting Clube de Portugal.

Having been the most represented club in the Olympic Games of Athens, this section of the club, headed many years by Prof. Mário Moniz Pereira, who died in 2016, is one of the most decorated Portuguese athletics teams and is responsible for much of the titles won by the club throughout its 100 years of history. In the year 2011 began the annual Sporting race.

Honours (Men's)

Domestic competitions

Portuguese Outdoor Men's Athletics Championship
 Winners (48): 1941, 1943, 1945, 1946, 1947, 1948, 1950, 1956, 1957, 1958, 1959, 1960, 1961, 1962, 1963, 1964, 1965, 1966, 1968, 1969, 1970, 1971, 1972, 1973, 1974, 1975, 1976, 1977, 1978, 1979, 1981, 1985, 1987, 1988, 1995, 1997, 1998, 1999, 2000, 2001, 2003, 2004, 2005, 2006, 2007, 2008, 2009, 2010

Portuguese Indoor Men's Athletics Championship
 Winners (17): 1996, 1997, 1998, 1999, 2000, 2001, 2003, 2004, 2005, 2006, 2007, 2008, 2009, 2010, 2011, 2017

Portuguese Cross Country Championship:
 Winners (49): 1912, 1928, 1930, 1931, 1935, 1941, 1942, 1943, 1948, 1949, 1950, 1952, 1959, 1960, 1961, 1962, 1963, 1965, 1966, 1967, 1968, 1969, 1970, 1971, 1972, 1973, 1974, 1976, 1977, 1978, 1979, 1980, 1982, 1983, 1984, 1985, 1986, 1987, 1988, 1989, 1991, 1993, 1995, 1997, 2016, 2017, 2018, 2019, 2021

Portuguese Cross Country mid-race Championship:
 Winners (8): 2000, 2001, 2002, 2003, 2009, 2010, 2011, 2012

Portuguese Men's Athletics Cup
 Winners (4): 1997, 1998, 1999, 2000

International competitions
European Champion Clubs Cup
 Winners (1): 2000
 Runners-up (3): 2007, 2009, 2010
Copa Iberica

 Winners (1): 2021

European Champion Clubs Cup Cross Country
Winners (15): 1977, 1979, 1981, 1982, 1983, 1984, 1985, 1986, 1989, 1990, 1991, 1992, 1993, 1994, 2018

Honours (Women's)

Domestic competitions

Portuguese Outdoor Women's Athletics Championship
 Winners (49): 1945, 1946, 1947, 1959, 1960, 1961, 1962, 1963, 1964, 1965, 1966, 1967, 1968, 1969, 1970, 1971, 1972, 1973, 1974, 1975, 1976, 1979, 1980, 1981, 1987, 1995, 1996, 1997, 1998, 1999, 2000, 2001, 2002, 2003, 2004, 2005, 2006, 2007, 2008, 2009, 2011, 2012, 2013, 2014, 2015, 2016, 2017, 2018

Portuguese Indoor Women's Athletics Championship
 Winners (23): 1995, 1996, 1997, 1998, 1999, 2000, 2001, 2002, 2003, 2004, 2005, 2006 , 2007, 2008, 2009, 2011, 2012, 2013, 2014, 2015, 2016, 2017, 2018

Portuguese Cross Country Championship:
 Winners (8): 1972, 1973, 1974, 2014, 2017, 2018, 2019, 2021

Portuguese Cross Country mid-race Championship:
 Winners (7): 2000, 2012, 2013, 2014, 2015, 2016, 2017

Portuguese Women's Athletics Cup
 Winners (5): 1996, 1997, 1998, 1999, 2000

International competitions
European Champion Clubs Cup
 Winners (2): 2016, 2018

European Champion Clubs Cup Cross Country
Winners (2): 2018, 2019

Technical staff

Notable past athletes

António Stromp
Salazar Carreira
Mário Moniz Pereira
Álvaro Dias
Manuel Faria
Manuel de Oliveira
Lídia Faria
Armando Aldegalega
Carlos Lopes
Fernando Mamede
Aniceto Simões
José Carvalho
Hélder de Jesus
Domingos Castro
Dionísio Castro
Ezequiel Canário
Manuela Machado
Carla Sacramento
Rui Silva
Carlos Calado
Paulo Guerra
Francis Obikwelu
Naíde Gomes
Arnaldo Abrantes (father)
Arnaldo Abrantes (son)
Carlos Cabral
Lucrécia Jardim
Rafael Marques

References

 Sporting CP Official Website

Sporting CP sports
Sport in Lisbon
Running clubs in Portugal
1906 establishments in Portugal